The Great Pyramid Robbery is a fantasy novel by English writer Katherine Roberts, the first book in The Seven Fabulous Wonders series and the prequel to The Babylon Game.

Plot summary
Novel is about a young hemutiu called Senu and his ghostly double Red. Senu is usually the class clown and uses his Ka for playing practical jokes on his family. When Senu and a group of his friends play a dare in the hemutiu tombs, the dare goes horribly wrong when Senu and his Ka make contact with the Ka's of the dead. Senu is frightened, and runs out of the tomb before he finds out what he had done. Senu's Heka gets the attention of the Imakhu captain Nemhab. Nemheb then sends Senu to the Mertu gang the Scorpions, building Lord Khafre's pyramid. Senu is then helplessly tangled in a struggle for the two lands. After Senu battles Nemheb's Ka when trying to free red he became the Sem-Priest.

2001 British novels
British fantasy novels
Novels by Katherine Roberts
Novels set in ancient Egypt
Voyager Books books